Rodney Dennis Chandler (born July 13, 1942) is an American politician and journalist who served as a former U.S. Representative from Washington from 1983 to 1993.

He is the great-great-grandnephew of long-time U.S. Senator Zachariah Chandler of Michigan.

Biography 
Rod Chandler received a B.S. from Eastern Oregon College and a M.Ed. from the University of Nevada, Las Vegas.

Chandler is a former television news correspondent and public relations consultant.

Political career 
He was elected to the Washington House of Representatives in 1974. In 1982 he was elected as a Republican to the 98th Congress, representing the newly created  until 1993, when he gave up his seat for an unsuccessful candidacy for the United States Senate. He seemed to have the upper hand during a debate when he inexplicably responded to Patty Murray's criticism for spending $120,000 on congressional mailings during an economic recession by quoting the Roger Miller song "Dang Me". He was further damaged by the unpopularity in the Pacific Northwest of incumbent President George H. W. Bush, who was largely blamed for the recession. In 1989 Chandler revealed publicly that he is a recovered alcoholic.

Later career 
Chandler taught Advanced Placement Government classes at Eaglecrest High School in Centennial, Colorado until the end of the 2006–07 school year.

Chandler is a member of the ReFormers Caucus of Issue One.

Chandler endorsed Democrat Joe Biden during the 2020 United States presidential election, wanting to prevent the re-election of President Donald Trump.

Electoral history

References

External links

|-

|-

1942 births
American television reporters and correspondents
Eastern Oregon University alumni
Living people
Republican Party members of the Washington House of Representatives
People from Aurora, Colorado
People from La Grande, Oregon
People from Redmond, Washington
Republican Party members of the United States House of Representatives from Washington (state)
United States Army soldiers
University of Nevada, Las Vegas alumni
Oregon National Guard personnel
Members of Congress who became lobbyists